Rewan Refaei (born 1 September 1996) is an Egyptian taekwondo practitioner. She won the gold medal at the 2018 African Taekwondo Championships held in Agadir, Morocco in the women's -62 kg event.

She also competed in the women's lightweight event at the 2015 World Taekwondo Championships and at the 2017 World Taekwondo Championships and at the 2019 World Taekwondo Championships.

At the 2019 African Games held in Rabat, Morocco, she won the silver medal in the women's -62 kg event.

References

External links 
 

1996 births
Place of birth missing (living people)
Living people
Egyptian female taekwondo practitioners
African Games medalists in taekwondo
African Games silver medalists for Egypt
Competitors at the 2015 African Games
Competitors at the 2019 African Games
African Taekwondo Championships medalists
21st-century Egyptian women